The mixed team relay in short track speed skating at the 2016 Winter Youth Olympics was held on 20 February at the Gjøvik Olympic Cavern Hall.

Results 
 QA – qualified for Final A
 QB – qualified for Final B
 PEN – penalty

Semifinals

Final B

Final A

References 

 
Mixed team relay